Philodice is a genus of hummingbirds in the tribe Mellisugini and family Trochilidae.

Taxonomy
The genus Philodice was introduced in 1866 by the French ornithologists Étienne Mulsant, Jules Verreaux and Édouard Verreaux to accommodate a single species, the purple-throated woodstar, which is therefore the type species. The genus name comes from Greek mythology, Pholodice was the wife of Leucippus and daughter of Inachus.

The genus now contains two species that were formerly assigned to Calliphlox. They were placed in the resurrected genus Philodice based on a molecular phylogenetic study that was published in 2017.

The two species are:

References 

Philodice
Bird genera
Taxa named by Jules Verreaux